
Gmina Żytno is a rural gmina (administrative district) in Radomsko County, Łódź Voivodeship, in central Poland.

Villages
Gmina Żytno contains the villages and settlements of Barycz, Borzykowa, Borzykówka, Brzeziny, Budzów, Bugaj, Ciężkowiczki, Czarny Las, Czech, Czechowiec, Ewina, Ferdynandów, Folwark, Fryszerka, Grodzisko, Ignaców, Jacków, Jatno, Kąty, Kępa, Kolonia Czechowiec, Kozie Pole, Łazów, Magdalenki, Mała Wieś, Maluszyn, Mosty, Nurek, Pągów, Pierzaki, Pławidła, Polichno, Pukarzów, Rędziny, Rędziny-Kolonia, Rogaczówek, Sady, Sekursko, Silnica, Silniczka, Sowin, Sudzin, Sudzinek, Turznia, Wymysłów, Załawie and Żytno.

Neighbouring gminas
Gmina Żytno is bordered by the gminas of Dąbrowa Zielona, Gidle, Kluczewsko, Kobiele Wielkie, Koniecpol, Wielgomłyny and Włoszczowa.

References
Polish official population figures 2006

Zytno
Radomsko County